Across the Universe is a trilogy of young adult science fiction novels written by American author Beth Revis. Chronicling the life of Amy Martin aboard a generation ship hundreds of years in the future, Across the Universe, the first novel published in 2011 by Razorbill, received a starred Kirkus review and made the New York Bestseller List for Children's Chapter Books.

Plot summary
Hundreds of years in the future, the spaceship Godspeed travels toward a distant, earth-like planet with 100 cryogenically frozen settlers on board.  Seventeen year old Amy, frozen along with her parents, wakes early and only to find herself in the middle of a strange, regimented society made up of those born on the ship over generations. With the help of Elder, the ship's only teenager and future leader, she must solve a murder mystery, and save the ship. They must hurry before the murderer kills any more people, and before time runs out of life.

Books in this universe
 Across the Universe (2011)
 A Million Suns (2012)
 Shades of Earth (2013)
 The Body Electric (2014)

The first three books in the series make up the original trilogy, published by Penguin Books. The fourth book is a standalone novel set in the same universe, and was self-published by Revis.

Short Fiction in this universe
 The Other Elder
 Love is a Choice
 Night Swimming
 As They Slip Away 

Revis has also written short fiction that takes place in the universe of her trilogy, including As They Slip Away, a novella available as a free download from Penguin Teen, as well as short stories in the anthologies After (edited by Ellen Datlow and Terri Windling), which includes The other Elder; Shards and Ashes (edited by Melissa Marr and Kelley Armstrong), which includes Love is a choice; and Defy the Dark (edited by Sandra Mitchell).

Reception
Across the Universe debuted on the New York Times Bestseller List for Children's Chapter Books at #7 in January 2011, and received a Kirkus starred review.  It was long-listed for the Carnegie Medal, and chosen as a YALSA Teens Top Ten book for 2012.

The sequel, A Million Suns, debuted on the bestseller list at #10.  It was named a Best Teen Book of the Year by Kirkus Reviews.

When the final book in the series, Shades of Earth, received more pre-orders than the previous two books combined, Revis' publisher launched a copy of Across the Universe into space.

References

External links
Across the Universe official website

2011 American novels
2011 science fiction novels
Children's science fiction novels
American science fiction novels
American young adult novels
Novels set in the 24th century
Cryonics in fiction
Razorbill books
Generation ships in fiction